The lettered olive, Oliva sayana, is a species of large predatory sea snail, a marine gastropod mollusc in the family Olividae, the olive shells, olive snails, or olives.

Subspecies
, the lettered olive contains the following accepted subspecies:

Oliva sayana sarasotensis Petuch & Sargent, 1986
Oliva sayana sayana Ravenel, 1834
Oliva sayana texana Petuch & Sargent, 1986

Distribution
The species' range is from North Carolina to Florida, the Gulf states of North America, including Louisiana and Texas; and further south to the east coast of Mexico, including Campeche State, Yucatán State and Quintana Roo. It may also occur in Brazil.

Habitat
The lettered olive typically lives in near-shore waters, on shallow sand flats near inlets. The empty shell is occasionally, or sometimes commonly, washed up onto ocean beaches.

Shell description
It is a smooth, shiny, cylindrical-shaped shell with a short spire. The aperture is narrow and extending almost the length of shell, continuing around the bottom and ending in a notch on the other side. The suture is V-cut and deep. The lower part of the whorl is just above where the suture extends outward and then at a sharp shoulder drops into the suture.

The shell coloration can vary from cream to a greyish exterior with reddish-brown zigzag markings. The common name of this species is derived from the darker surface markings that sometimes resemble letters.

Life habits
Like all olives, the lettered olive is a carnivore: it captures bivalves and small crustaceans with its foot and takes them below the sand surface to digest.

Its presence is sometimes detected at very low tides by the trails it leaves when it crawls below the surface on semi-exposed sand flats.

Females lay floating, round egg capsules that are often found in beach drift. Young are free swimming.

Human use
Colonists and early Native Americans made jewelry from these shells.

The lettered olive is the state shell of South Carolina.

References

 Petuch E.J. & Sargent D.M. (1986). Atlas of the living olive shells of the world. xv + 253 pp., 39 pls.
 Petuch E.J. (1988). Neogene history of tropical American mollusks. Charlottesville, Virginia: The Coastal Education and Research Foundation. 217 pp., 23 figs + unnumbered figs, 39 pls.
 Rosenberg, G.; Moretzsohn, F.; García, E. F. (2009). Gastropoda (Mollusca) of the Gulf of Mexico, Pp. 579–699 in: Felder, D.L. and D.K. Camp (eds.), Gulf of Mexico–Origins, Waters, and Biota. Texas A&M Press, College Station, Texas.

Oliva (gastropod)
Gastropods described in 1834